Volodymyr Viktorovych Dychko (born 7 September 1972 in Komsomolske, Donetsk Oblast) is a former Ukrainian football defender.

Club history
Volodymyr Dychko transferred from Kaisar to Zirka during 2006 winter transfer window. Volodymyr Dychko decided to retire from playing in January 2009. He came out of retirement and signed with FC Kremin Kremenchuk during 2009 summer transfer window.

Career statistics

References

External links
 
 Players – Official Vorskla site 
 

1972 births
Living people
People from Komsomolske, Donetsk Oblast
Soviet footballers
Ukrainian footballers
Association football defenders
Ukrainian expatriate footballers
Expatriate footballers in Belarus
Expatriate footballers in Kazakhstan
FC Olympik Kharkiv players
FC Ahrotekhservis Sumy players
FC Kremin Kremenchuk players
FC Vorskla Poltava players
FC Vorskla-2 Poltava players
FC Elektron Romny players
FC Naftovyk-Ukrnafta Okhtyrka players
FC Gomel players
FC Mariupol players
FC Illichivets-2 Mariupol players
FC Ordabasy players
FC Kaisar players
FC Zirka Kropyvnytskyi players
Ukrainian Premier League players
Kazakhstan Premier League players
Belarusian Premier League players
Sportspeople from Donetsk Oblast